Manuel Álvarez Jiménez (23 May 1928 – 24 August 1998) was a Chilean football defender who played for Chile in the 1950 FIFA World Cup. He also played for Universidad Católica.

Record at FIFA tournaments

References

External links
FIFA profile

1928 births
1998 deaths
Chilean footballers
Chile international footballers
Club Deportivo Universidad Católica footballers
Association football defenders
1950 FIFA World Cup players